The Amazing Race Asia 3 is the third season of The Amazing Race Asia, a reality television game show based on the American series The Amazing Race. The third installment of the show features ten teams of two with a pre-existing relationship, in a race around Asia to win US$100,000. The season premiered on September 11, 2008 and consists of 11 episodes, two episodes fewer than the first and second seasons. The season finale aired on November 20, 2008.

Friends Vince Chung and Sam Wu, representing Hong Kong, were the winners of this season. Vince also became the first non-Asian by nationality to win The Amazing Race Asia.

Production

Development and filming

The third season of The Amazing Race Asia covered 21,600 kilometres in six countries. Route markers were coloured yellow and white in Vietnam to avoid confusion with the former flag of South Vietnam. This season introduced the U-Turn marker, while the Intersection was not included. This season, like the American version's Family Edition and the Brazilian version, was the first time The Amazing Race Asia traveled across one continent, Asia (previous seasons covered at least two continents). Unlike past seasons, this was the first season to not have the first leg as a non-elimination leg. This season also had the number of episodes decreased from 13 to 11.

According to AXN, this season was dubbed as "the toughest Race ever" compared to previous seasons as both contestants and crew personnel experienced high fatigue during this season due to the faster pace and shorter break times. During filming, one production crew member was even hospitalized.

This was the only season of The Amazing Race Asia did not visit the country of Singapore.

Paula Taylor, one of the racers in Season 2, appeared as the local greeter in the first leg.

Footage from the start of the season was shown on the ninth episode of The Amazing Race 16.

Casting
Applications for the third season were due on March 3, 2008 (extended from the original deadline on February 25, 2008). Interviews for semi-finalists and finalists were held sometime around March or April 2008. Filming was expected to have taken place around the middle of 2008.

Marketing
The third season of The Amazing Race Asia had six official sponsors: Caltex, MASkargo, Nokia, Singha, Sony and Standard Chartered Bank.

Broadcasting
A special episode known as "Racers Revealed" aired one week before the actual premiere, on September 4, 2008, and a special "Memories" episode aired after the season finale on November 27, 2008, similar to the second season.

Awards
In 2009, the series was nominated for an International Emmy Award for Best Non-Scripted Entertainment, losing to the Dutch reality series The Phone.

Cast
This season's cast include cousins, and a father & son team. Like Season 2, this season featured a large number of local media personalities or their relatives. Natalie Glebova is the winner of Miss Universe 2005 and also the wife of Thai tennis player Paradorn Srichaphan. Her teammate, Pailin, is the runner-up in 2006 Miss Thailand Universe and also contested in Miss Earth 2006. Tisha Silang is the ex-girlfriend of Survivor Philippines's host, Paolo Bediones and was once Miss Philippines but had to forgo her crown due to her Canadian citizenship, while Ida, Niroo and Mai are famous actors in their respective homelands and Bernie is the host of Project Runway Malaysia. Isaac & William are sports commentators and football agents for professional players in the Korean K-League. Vince Matthew Chung is a leading stand-up comedian in Hong Kong, often performing and hosting at The TakeOut Comedy Club Hong Kong, and was a finalist in Hong Kong's first nationwide stand-up comedy competition.

This season consists of three non-Asians. Natalie and Vince are Canadians (though Natalie was born in Russia; Vince has a Chinese ethnicity), and Geoff is from New Zealand. Additionally, Sam, who was originally from Singapore, is representing Hong Kong. Tisha is of Canadian nationality but of Filipino ethnicity; Henry and Bernie are of Australian nationality but of Chinese ethnicity, however they are representing Malaysia.

Kynt Cothron and Vyxsin Fiala's audition video was shown on the "Racers Revealed" episode. Michael McKay, the executive producer of the show, confirmed that Kynt & Vyxsin of season 12 of the original American version of The Amazing Race did really submit an audition tape but did not make it because according to McKay "we felt it would be unfair to have a team that had already raced (and raced very well I might add) and also we take teams from Asia. But if we do an All Star version down the track you never know."

Tania Khan died in late 2020 at the age of 48.

Results
The following teams participated in the season, with their relationships at the time of filming. Placements are listed in finishing order:
A  placement with a dagger indicates that the team was eliminated. 
A  placement with a double-dagger indicates that the team was the last to arrive at a pit stop in a non-elimination leg.
An  placement indicates that the team was marked for elimination; if the team did not place 1st in the next leg, they would receive a 30-minute penalty.
An  placement indicates that the team had to relinquish all of their money and were not allotted money for the next leg.
A  indicates that the team won a Fast Forward.
A  indicates that the team chose to use the Yield, and a  indicates the team who received it.
A  means the team chose to use a U-Turn, and a  indicates the team who received it.

Notes

Episode title quotes
Episode titles are often taken from quotes made by the racers.

"The Toughest Race Ever" – Season Tagline
"I Wanna Be A Man" – Bernie
"You Are Running Away, Nobody's Helping Me" – Niroo
"Where's Our Car?" – Kapil
"You See How They're Not Fighting All The Time" – Oliver
"I Think I'm Cuter" – Sam
"What The Fish?" – Tania
"The Gloves Are Coming Off, The War Paint Is Coming On" – Vince
"Are People Here Funny?" – A.D.
"I'm Telling You Right Now There's No Giving Up" – Vince
"The Moment You've Been Racing For And The Moment We've Been Waiting For" – Allan Wu

Prizes
Individual prizes were awarded to the first team to complete a leg.
Leg 1 – US$2,500 for each team member, courtesy of Standard Chartered Bank.
Leg 2 – Free Caltex fuel with techron for a year.
Leg 3 – A Sony Handycam for each team member.
Leg 4 – A Nokia N96 handphone for each team member.
Leg 5 – A three-day, two-night holiday in Ko Samui, Thailand, courtesy of Singha Beer.
Leg 6 – A three-day, two-night holiday in Ko Samui, Thailand, courtesy of Singha Beer.
Leg 7 – A Sony BRAVIA and Sony PlayStation 3 for each team member.
Leg 8 – A holiday in Hong Kong, courtesy of Caltex.
Leg 9 – A Nokia N96 handphone for each team member.
Leg 10 – US$2,500 for each team member, courtesy of Standard Chartered Bank.
Leg 11 – US$100,000

Race summary

Leg 1 (Thailand)

Airdate: September 11, 2008
Bangkok, Thailand (King Rama I Monument) (Starting Line)
Bangkok (Khaosan Road)
 Pathum Thani (Amphoe Khlong Luang – Caltex Service Station) to Suphan Buri
 Suphan Buri (Wat Phai Rong Wua) to Chiang Mai (Chiang Mai Arcade Bus Station)
 Chiang Mai (Chiang Mai X-Centre or Rice Field)
Chiang Mai (Ratchaphruek Garden – Ho Kham Royal Pavilion) 

This season's first Detour was a choice between Race or Rice. In Race, teams had to proceed to the Chiang Mai X-Centre and drive an off-road buggy over an  track to receive their next clue. In Rice, teams had to work together to pound rice into paste and make two rice balls before receiving their next clue.

Additional tasks
At Khaosan Road, each team had to consume one large bowl of Thai street food, consisting of assorted fried bugs, frogs and scorpions, to receive their next clue.
At the Caltex Service Station, each team had to completely clean a 22-seat passenger bus to the Caltex supervisor's satisfaction. Once they finished, teams had to signup for one of three newly washed buses to Suphan Buri, the first and second would carry three teams while the last bus would carry four teams.
At Wat Phai Rong Wua, teams had to search the temple grounds for their next clue hidden amongst hundreds of Buddha statues. The first two buses, however, would depart 20 minutes after they arrived at the temple. After finding a clue, teams had to board the next available bus to go to Chiang Mai Arcade Bus Station, where they would find their next clue.

Leg 2 (Thailand → Vietnam)

Airdate: September 18, 2008
Mae Kham Pong (Flight of the Gibbon) (Overnight Rest)
Chiang Mai (Sathit Buarawong Banana Plantation) 
 Chiang Mai (Chiang Mai International Airport) to Ho Chi Minh City, Vietnam (Tan Son Nhat International Airport)
Ho Chi Minh City (Saigon Opera House)
Ho Chi Minh City (Saigon Phố Cafe)
Ho Chi Minh City (Bến Thành Market)
 Ho Chi Minh City (Ben Thanh Bus Station) to Cái Bè (Cái Bè Bus Station)
Cái Bè (Cái Bè Cao Dai Temple)
 Cái Bè (Cái Bè Bus Station) to Ho Chi Minh City
Ho Chi Minh City (Saigon Central Post Office)
Ho Chi Minh City (Museum of Vietnamese History) 

In this season's first Roadblock, one team member had to cross a plantation and retrieve their next clue from a hanging backpack without being hit by snipers brandishing paintball guns, who would fire paintballs at the team member. If the team member was shot, they had to return to the starting point and perform the task again.

This leg's Detour was a choice between Sampan and Some Walk. In Sampan, teams had to load a sampan with fruit and then row it across the river to a trader, who would give teams their next clue. In Some Walk, teams had to gather twenty live chickens and then deliver then using a đòn gánh to a vendor in the land market to receive their next clue.

Additional tasks
At the Flight of the Gibbon, teams had to go through a jungle heights course consisting of zip-lines and a parallel drop before getting their next clue.
At Saigon Phố Cafe, each team member had to play a Nokia N-Gage game, known as System Rush: Evolution, on a Nokia N82 handphone and complete three laps around a track within a time limit to receive their next clue.
At Thánh Nữ Jeanne D'Arc Church, teams had to choose a Red Cross aid expert, each representing one of the nine available charity organisations, and use US$500 from Singha to purchase supplies as needed by the organisation. Once complete, team would find their next clue outside the Saigon Central Post Office.

Leg 3 (Vietnam)

Airdate: September 25, 2008
Ho Chi Minh City (Saigon Zoo and Botanical Gardens) (Pit Start)
 Ho Chi Minh City (Mien Dong Coach Station) to Huế (Bến Xe Phía Bắc)
Huế (Trần Thanh Mại – Caltex Service Facility)
Hương Thủy (Khải Định Tomb)
 Hương Trà (Minh Mạng Tomb) and Hương Thủy (Khải Định Tomb)
 Hương Thủy (Dạ Lê Thượng Shrine or Rice Paddy Field)
 Huế (Quốc Học Park to Huế Citadel – Thế Miếu Temple) 

In this leg's Roadblock, one team member had to retrieve seven coins representing the seven emperors of the Nguyễn dynasty at Minh Mạng Tomb then bring them back to Khải Định Tomb, where they would find out that they had to place the coins in the correct order of the reign of the emperors to receive their next clue. Each table that had a coin at Minh Mạng Tomb also contained information about the reigns of the corresponding emperor, and racers could return to the tomb to obtain this information.

This leg's Detour was a choice between Sticks and Stalks. In Sticks, teams had watch a silent demonstration and then make ten incense sticks to receive their next clue. In Stalks, teams had to thresh rice stalks into a farming machine and fill two baskets to receive their next clue from a farmer.

Additional tasks
At the Caltex service facility, teams had to change the rear tires and engine oil of a marked jeep, their transportation for the rest of the leg, to receive their next clue.
At Quốc Học Park, teams had to search for a marked cyclo with their next clue and use it to travel to the Pit Stop.

Leg 4 (Vietnam → Taiwan)

Airdate: October 2, 2008
 Huế (Phu Bai International Airport) to Taipei, Taiwan (Taiwan Taoyuan International Airport)
Taipei (Ximending – Red Playhouse)
 Taipei (Miniatures Museum of Taiwan or Raohe Street Night Market)
Taipei County (Xinzhuang District – Institute for the Blind of Taiwan)
Taipei County (Shenkeng District – Old Street) 
Taipei (City Hall Square) 

This leg's Detour was a choice between Shoot It or Shape It. In Shoot It, teams had to drive themselves to the Miniatures Museum of Taiwan and pick a Sony Cyber-shot camera to photograph a miniature model of an Amazing Race envelope hidden inside one of the dioramas. After the photo was printed, teams' next clue could be found behind their new photo. In Shape It, teams had to drive themselves to Raohe Street Night Market, where they had to recreate four shapes using a large tangram set to receive their next clue.

In this leg's Roadblock, one team member had to eat an entire bowl of stinky tofu, a delicacy common in Taiwanese cuisine, to receive their next clue from a waiter.

Additional tasks
After arriving in Taipei, teams had to choose a marked car and drive themselves to the Red Playhouse to find their next clue.
At the Institute for the Blind of Taiwan, one team member would be blindfolded and then, using their hands only to feel a braille message, describe each letter to their partner, who could not see their teammate's board, to decipher the correct phrase "Go to Shenkeng" and receive their next clue. One team would find a check worth NT$612,000 (US$20,000) courtesy of Standard Chartered inside their next clue and would donate it to the institute before proceeding.

Leg 5 (Taiwan)

Airdate: October 9, 2008
Taipei (New Sogo Department Store – Sony Style Store)
Taipei (Intersection of Xining South Road & Wuchang Street)
 Taipei (Kevin's Tattoo)
Taipei County (Pingshi District – Pingshi Coal Mine) 
 Taipei or Taipei County (Zhonghe District – Yuantong Temple)
Taipei (Taipei Astronomical Museum) 

In this season's only Fast Forward, one team had to drive to an intersection, where there would find a clue box. The clue would then instruct each team member to get a permanent tattoo at Kevin's Tattoo to win the Fast Forward award.

In this leg's Roadblock, one team member had to find a souvenir, a small silver token that had the AXN logo on one side and The Amazing Race Asia logo on the other side, hidden in a mine cart full of coal and exchange it for their next clue.

This leg's Detour was a choice between Pick or Pail. In Pick, teams had to drive themselves to Wan Nian Building and retrieve three stuffed toys from inside from a claw machine to receive their next clue. In Pail, teams had to go to the Yuantong Temple, fill a bucket full of water, and carry it to the top of the mountain, where a monk would check to see if they had enough water. If they had enough, teams would receive their next clue.

Additional task
At the Sony Style Store, teams had to find a Blu-ray disc out of a thousand in the racks that displayed "Correct! You may receive your next clue." when played on a Blu-ray player, while the others would display "Sorry. Try again."

Leg 6 (Taiwan → Hong Kong)

Airdate: October 16, 2008
 Taipei (Taiwan Taoyuan International Airport) to Chek Lap Kok, Hong Kong, China (Hong Kong International Airport)
Kowloon City District (Ho Man Tin – King's Park Sports Ground)
Central and Western District (Intersection of Hollywood Road & Peel Street)
 Central and Western District (Graham Street or Mee Lun Street)
 Central and Western District (Central Piers) to Yau Tsim Mong District (Star Ferry Pier, Tsim Sha Tsui)
Yau Tsim Mong District (Mong Kok – Ladies' Market) 
Southern District (Stanley – Blake Pier) 

This leg's Detour was a choice between Get Fishy or Get Lucky. In Get Fishy, teams had to find a seafood store on Graham Street and clean, gut and scale 15 fish to the satisfaction of a fishmonger to receive their next clue. In Get Lucky, teams had to find a marked table on Mee Lun Street and bite open 300 fortune cookies in a jar until they found the one cookie containing a fortune that stated they could get their next clue.

In this leg's Roadblock, one team member had to choose one of the provided handbags and search through the crowded market for the woman carrying the same handbag, who would give them their next clue.

Additional task
At King's Park Sports Ground, teams had to get through the rugby field to the clue box at the opposite end of the field while the Standard Chartered national rugby union players attempted to block their path.

Leg 7 (Hong Kong → Macau)

Airdate: October 23, 2008
Yau Tsim Mong District (Mong Kok – Goldfish Market)
Central and Western District (Sheung Wan – Bonham Strand)
 Central and Western District (Hong Kong–Macau Ferry Terminal) to Freguesia da Sé, Macau (Outer Harbour Ferry Terminal)
 Freguesia da Sé (Senado Square)
Freguesia da Sé (Macau Tower)  
Freguesia da Sé (Sai Van Lake – Dragon Boat Pier) 
 Freguesia de São Lourenço (A-Ma Temple Square or Hotel Royal Macau)
Freguesia de São Francisco Xavier (A-Ma Cultural Village) 

In this leg's Roadblock, one team member had to climb to the top of the mast of the Macau Tower to obtain their next clue and go down back to their partner before reading their next clue. However, due to lightning, not all of the racers who chose to perform the Roadblock were allowed to climb the exterior spire as a precaution and were given their clue.

This leg's Detour was a choice between Dance or Chance. In Dance, teams had to correctly perform a lion dance routine to the satisfaction of the dance troupe to receive their next clue. In Chance, teams had to don formal attire and play a game of blackjack in the casino of Hotel Royal Macau. Teams had to beat the dealer nine times (as denoted each letter given after a win that would form the word COMPLETED) to receive their next clue.

Additional tasks
In Mong Kok, teams had to pick up four goldfish and bring them to a designated pet shop at Bonham Strand to exchange for their next clue.
Once in Macau, teams had to travel by pedicab to the fountain at Senado Square to find their next clue.
At Sai Van Lake, teams had to paddle a dragon boat around a floating Caltex buoy and return to the pier to get their next clue.
At A-Ma Culture Village, teams had to arrange lanterns bearing the animals of the Chinese zodiac into the correct order before being let into the Pit Stop.

Leg 8 (Macau → Hong Kong → India)

Airdate: October 30, 2008
Freguesia de Santo António (Ruins of Saint Paul's)
Freguesia da Sé (Macau Tower) 
 Freguesia da Sé (Outer Harbour Ferry Terminal) to Central and Western District, Hong Kong (Hong Kong–Macau Ferry Terminal) or  Freguesia da Sé (Macau Heliport) to Central and Western District (Shun Tak Heliport)
Chek Lap Kok, Islands District (Hong Kong International Airport – MASkargo Warehouse)
 Chek Lap Kok (Hong Kong International Airport) to Kochi, India (Cochin International Airport)
Kochi (Neelam Kulangara Devi Temple)
Kochi (Kumbalam – Elephant Wash Grounds near SPS Temple)
 Kochi (Fort Kochi – Chinese Fishing Nets and Marina The Sea Face Restaurant or Mattancherry Palace)
Kochi (Bolgatty Palace) 

In this leg's Roadblock, one team member had to perform the world's highest bungee jump from the top of the Macau Tower and fall  to the ground to receive their next clue. The first team to complete the task would receive a helicopter ride from Macau to Hong Kong instead of the TurboJET ferry ride.

This leg's Detour was a choice between Fish or Fill. In Fish, team members had to carry six  marlins to a nearby restaurant to receive their next clue. In Fill, teams had to recreate an intricate floor pattern using coloured rice, known as Rangoli, to receive their next clue.

Additional tasks
At the MASkargo warehouse, teams had to search for a box addressed to them containing letters from their loved ones before receiving their next clue.
At Neelam Kulangara Devi Temple, teams had to get a good luck blessing from the priest before receiving their next clue.
At the elephant wash grounds in Kumbalam, teams had to wash an elephant using coconut husks as abrasives to receive their next clue.

Leg 9 (India)

Airdate: November 6, 2008
 Kochi (Cochin International Airport) to Mumbai (Chhatrapati Shivaji Maharaj International Airport)
Pune (Jawaharlal Nehru Stadium)
Pune (Shaniwar Wada) 
Pune (Equity Tower – Sony World)
 Pune (Datta Shinde Pottery Shop and Mahatma Phule Market – Rajkumar Provision Stores or Agarwal Sweets)
Pune (Desai Bahndhu Ambewale) 
Pune (Gokhale Institute) 

In this leg's Roadblock, one team member had to find a pheta with the word "Correct" inside it amongst ones worn by 50 men walking around the fort to receive their next clue.

This leg's Detour was a choice between Push and Crush. In Push, teams had to go to Datta Shinde Pottery Shop, where they had to load a cart with 75 pots and push it one kilometre to Rajkumar Provision Stores in Mahatma Phule Market with at least 70 intact pots remaining to receive next clue. In Crush, teams had to go to Agarwal Sweets, where they had to crush sugarcane sticks to make 40 glasses of sugarcane juice and sell them to earn at least 200 to receive their next clue.

Additional tasks
At Nehru Stadium, one team member had to hit a cricket ball onto an Amazing Race-coloured boundary to receive their next clue. If teams did not manage to do so after 36 bowls, they would incur a ten-minute penalty before receiving their next clue.
After the cricket task, teams use a map application on the Nokia 6210 Navigator to direct their auto rickshaw driver to their next destination, the Shaniwar Wada.
At Sony World, teams had to persuade the locals to tell them a joke while one team member recorded them on a Sony Handycam, then teams have to come back and replay the video to the staff. If the staff thought the joke was funny enough, they would give teams their next clue.

Leg 10 (India → Oman)

Airdate: November 13, 2008
Bhaje (Bhaja Caves)
 Malavli (Malavli Railway Station) to Pune (Pune Central Railway Station)
Pune (Statue of Mahatma Gandhi)
Pune (Jangali Maharaj Road – Standard Chartered Bank)
 Pune (Pune Airport) to Muscat, Oman (Muscat International Airport)
Muscat (Al Alam Palace)
Nizwa (Nizwa Fort)
Muttrah (Muttrah Souq) 
Tanuf (Wadi Tanuf)  

This leg's Detour was a choice between Carpet and Count It. In Carpet, teams had to walk to a carpet shop and find two matching carpets, using the images in a Sony Cyber-shot as a reference, to receive their next clue from the shopkeeper. In Count It, teams had to walk to a shop and count the dried limes. Once each team gave their correct individual amount (1601, 1595, 1598, or 1577), the shop owner would hand them their next clue.

In this leg's Roadblock, one team member had to tyrolean traverse across Wadi Tanuf to retrieve their next clue on the other side before pulling themselves back across to reunite with their partner.

Additional tasks
At the Standard Chartered Bank, teams had to insert an ATM card and punch in Mahatma Gandhi's birth year: (1869 → 1-8-6-9) as the PIN to receive their next clue printed on the receipt. If a team made three unsuccessful attempts, they would incur a ten-minute time penalty before receiving their next clue.
Once in Muscat, teams had to find a marked vehicle to find their next clue.
At Nizwa Fort, teams had to search for the correct clue box containing their next clue from among the other clue boxes scattered around the fort.

Leg 11 (Oman → Thailand)

Airdate: November 20, 2008
Muscat (Office of Muscat Governorate)
Al Batinah (Al Abyadh – Said's Camel Farm) 
 Al Batinah (Hubra Sands)
 Muscat (Muscat International Airport) to Phuket, Thailand (Phuket International Airport)
Mueang Phuket (Sam Kong Temple)
Mueang Phuket (Sirey Island – Thai Trade Food Ice Factory)
 Mueang Phuket (Laem Hin Pier) to Ao Phang Nga National Park (Boat between Cape Yamu and Rang Noi Island)
  Ao Phang Nga National Park (Rang Yai Island – Rang Yai Pearl Farm or Andaman Sea)
Ao Phang Nga National Park (Rang Yai Island – Rang Yai Beach) 
Ao Phang Nga National Park (Rang Yai Island – Coconut Plantation) 

In this season's final Roadblock, one team member had to find one of seven keys out of seventy buried in the sand, using a metal detector, that would unlock a clue box.

This season's final Detour was a choice between Pull or Plunge. In Pull, teams had to kayak to Rang Yai pearl farm and find a marked shell by pulling from among 900 oyster lines. Then teams had to bring the marked shell back to the beach to exchange it for their next clue. In Plunge, teams had to snorkel and search for a giant clam shell containing a pearl, which they could exchange their next clue.

Additional tasks
At Said's Camel Farm, teams had to move ten camels into the holding pens before receiving their next clue.
At the Thai Trade Food Ice Factory, teams had to find a small clear cube buried in a barrel of ice shavings to get their next clue.
At Lam Hin Pier, teams had to ride a traditional Thai fishing boat, known as the long-tail boat, and look for a fisherman in a marked boat located between Cape Yamu and Rang Noi Island to receive their next clue.
After finishing the Detour, teams had to dig up a treasure chest within a marked area and carry it to the Finish Line at the nearby coconut plantation.

References

External links
Official website

Asia 3
2008 television seasons
Television shows filmed in Thailand
Television shows filmed in Vietnam
Television shows filmed in Taiwan
Television shows filmed in Hong Kong
Television shows filmed in Macau
Television shows filmed in India
Television shows filmed in Oman
Television shows filmed in the United Arab Emirates